The Hasidim of Ashkenaz (trans. Khasidei Ashkenaz; "German Pietists") were a Jewish mystical, ascetic movement in the German Rhineland during the 12th and 13th centuries.

Background
The leaders of the community of the Ashkenazi Hasidim movement were descended from the Kalonymos family of northern Italy, a family that had immigrated to Germany in the 10th century; and the Abun family of France, among others, according to the sacred books they wrote at the close of the 10th century. Ashkenazi Hasidicism was a social movement known for its strict asceticism and mystical doctrine who radically reimagined Jewish ethics, holding themselves accountable to din shamayim (an unwritten Law of Heaven) instead of traditional halakha. Some posit that its theology fits into the general canon of Jewish mysticism. It certainly parallels other Jewish mysticism; however in other ways it was very original. The extent of this community's effect and influence during Middle Age German Judaism has not been studied.

Prominent members
The line of thought that developed into Ashkenazi Hasidicism traces its roots to the Gaonic scholar Abu Aaron and extended to the three seminal thinkers of the late twelfth and early thirteenth centuries, Judah the Pious, Samuel the Pious, and Eleàzar of Worms.
Rabbi Judah the Pious (Rav Yehuda Ha-Hassid) of Regensburg was the foremost leader of the Ashkenazi Hasidim. His book Sefer Hasidim (Book of the Pious) is the most significant relic of this movement. He was born in 1150 in Speyer and died in 1217. He was a strong Talmudist and attended Tosafist schools. His experiences as a Tosafist may have contributed to his desperate plea to focus on the practical aspects of the Talmud, the Halacha. He was taught the Kabbala at a young age by his father, Samuel of Speyer (Samuel the Pious).

Samuel the Pious is said to have contributed some of the sections in Sefer Hasidim, and as the father and teacher of Judah the Pious, he directly contributed to much of this movement's thought. He authored the Shir Hakavod ("Song of the Glory"), which poetically describes Ashkenazi Hasidic theology, namely, the presence of the divine glory (kavod כבוד). He also authored the Book of the Fear of God (Sefer Hayirah) and Book of Repentance (Sefer Hateshuva).

Rabbi Eleazar of Worms was a leading Talmudist and Kabbalist in the 13th century and was the prime disciple of Judah the Pious. He is best known for his work, Sefer HaRokeah (Book of the Perfumer), a halakhic guide to ethics and Jewish law for the common reader. His prediction of coming of the messianic age to begin in 1226 and come to fruition in 1240 spread far and wide in Jewish communities. He was the last major member attributed to this movement and died in 1230.

Theology
The Hasidim's most central tenets concerned the “Will of the Creator”. They are obligated to follow the Din
Shamayim, “Law of Heaven”. Their devotion were expressed in both esoteric and perfectionist ways. Their
esoteric expression was in their dedication to prayer. They believed that you may rise spiritually toward
communion with God through the knowledge of prayer.

The theology of the Ashkenazi Hasidim is certainly independent and unique; however, it does contain meaningful similarities to the theologies of both the early kabbalists and of Saadia Gaon.

Saadia, in his Book of Beliefs and Opinions (אמונות ודעות) grapples with the following conundrum: throughout the Tanakh, Prophets frequently describe their visions of the divine realm. These descriptions include majestic images of God sitting on His heavenly throne, surrounded by the heavenly host. Since believing that God has perceivable, physical features is blasphemous for Saadia, he concludes that the visions do not portray God, but rather portray God's created glory. This glory is God's created messenger, his exalted angel, created to give the prophets something concrete to visualize.

The torat hakavod (Hebrew תורת הכבוד) of the Ashkenazi Hasidim echoes Saadia's theory, but with a fundamental difference. For the latter, the glory was not created by God, but emanated from God in a similar manner to the way that light emanates from the sun. What emerged is a tripartite system composed of God, the higher Kavod, and the lower Kavod. God is beyond human comprehension and impossible for man to relate to. The higher Kavod emanates from God, and is still very distant from man, but slightly more accessible. And finally, the lower Kavod is the element that man can access. It is at the lower Kavod that man can attempt to understand. 
 
This description of God and His divine realm directly parallels the kabbalistic ten-headed sefirotic system, with Ein Sof (Hebrew אין סוף) beyond knowledge on the top, and the ten sefirot emanating downward; the lower the sefira, the more relatable it becomes. Just as the unity of the sefirot is an indispensable concept in Kabbala, the inter-connectedness of the lower Kavod and higher Kavod is crucial for the Chassidei Ashkenaz. The lower Kavod is not separate from the higher Kavod but instead emanates from it.

As in Kabbala, there are many symbols and descriptions used to explain and refer to the Kavod. For example, in various Ashkenazi Hasidic works, the Kavod is referred to by the names of Demut Yakov Chakuk al Kisai HaKavod, Tiferet Yisrael, Kruv, Kisai Hakavod, Atara, Shin, Bas, and Sod.
	
Many of these references are present in "Shir Hakavod" by Rabbi Samuel the Pious, a poem written in praise of the Kavod.

Major work
Sefer Hasidim, by Rabbi Judah the Pious, is the most important work of the Chassidei Ashkenaz. The themes depicted within it most significantly portray the religious ideology of the Chassidei Ashkenaz. Sefer Hasidim contains over two thousand stories. Sefer Hasidim are told to individuals gathered around a leader and this leader was called a hasid bakhamor a Pietist Sage. The Pietist, as an individual but even more as a Sage, was existentially responsible for the transgressions of his fellows, indeed for the transgressions of Jewish society as a whole Samuel's son Judah went farther and depicted him as the head of a sect.

Two versions of the Sefer Hasidim exist, the Bologna Edition and the Parma MS Edition, and a debate about
which one represents an earlier version persists.

Major themes
The central idea of Sefer Hasidim its that there is a hidden will of God ("Ratzon Haborei") for his followers well beyond what is prescribed in the written and oral Torah, and the true worshiper of God seeks to fulfill the Ratzon Haborei. “We have not found it (the Torah) of ample strength (Job 27:23): - the Torah did not express the will of the creator, nor did it address itself to the needs of man.” Thus, there are an abundance of novel directives present in Sefer Hasidim, each one representing Ratzon Haborei. In fact, Rabbi Judah the Pious stipulates in the introduction to the book that one of his primary goals in writing Sefer Hasidim was to make this hidden will of God accessible to those who wish to find it:

[This book] is written for those who fear God and are mindful of His name. There is a Hasid whose heart desires, out of love for his creator do His will, but he is unaware of all these things [i.e. demands]- which thing to avoid and how to execute profoundly the wish of the Creator. For this reason, the Sefer Hasidim was written so that all who fear God and those returning to their Creator with an undivided heart may read it and know and understand what is incumbent upon them to do and what they must avoid. 

The quest to fulfill the Ratzon Haborei was not just a commendable, optional one; rather, as the introduction to the book details, it was a requisite aspect of proper divine service:

And we find in the Torah that anyone who was capable of understanding [a demand] even though he was not [explicitly] commanded is punished for not realizing [the requirement] on his own.

“And Moses was angry with the officers of the army . . . who had come from the service of the war. And he said to them, ‘Have you let all the women live?’” (Num. 31: 14-15). Why did they not reply, “You did not command us, for you did not tell us to kill the women”? But Moses knew that they were wise and perspicacious enough to infer [this command] on their own.
For this reason I set myself to writing a book for the God-fearing, lest they be punished and think [it is] for no reason. Far be it from God to do such a thing! (Gen. 18:25). . . . Therefore I have set forth this Book of Fear so that those who fear the word of God can take heed. “More than these, my son, must you take heed” (Eccl. 12:12).
 
Sefer Hasidim is replete with edicts that illuminate this theme of searching beyond the revealed instructions of the written and oral Torah and searching for the Ratzon Haborei. A specific example of this type of statute in Sefer Hasidim is the law of Chelev. Even though the oral law states clearly that one is permitted to derive benefit from Chelev, the Sefer Hasidim posits that if not for man's weaknesses it would have been forbidden, and thus it is forbidden to derive benefit from Chelev for any pious person.

The elitism of this group of Hasidim was another theme present in Sefer Hasidim. The Hasid is assertive, elitist, and in certain senses extreme in his efforts to impose his system upon his surroundings. The Hasid did not view his religious observance as merely admirable; he viewed it as the standard duties of any Jew. Therefore, integral to the Hasid's divine worship was an aspiration to positively influence others. In part, Sefer Hasidim is sated with praise for those who serve the public and equally filled with admonition for those who cause others to stumble. Acting for the common good became a leitmotif in Sefer Hasidim, and failure to take a public stand against wrongdoing is perceived as a grave sin. It was the Hasid's goal to enlighten those who needed enlightenment.

On the flip side, those who did not adhere to the "proper" lifestyle proscribed by Sefer Hasidim were constantly labeled as "Reshaim" (wicked ones). The "wicked" or the "unrighteous ones" were not to be called to the Torah, be given honors in the services, blow the ram's horn, or be a sandek at a circumcision. It is clear from Sefer Hasidim itself that this class of people was "wicked" simply from the perspective of the Hasidim. From the non-Hasid perspective, these often were scholars who make serious contributions to Halachic thought and give influential rulings on religious matters. "Wicked" to the Hasidic mind meant someone who did not live up to their austere standards.

Other themes include penance, Lilmod al Mnat Lkayem (Learn in order to fulfill), Jewish travel, and the attitude toward music.

Extent and influence
There has been much debate regarding the extent and influence that this movement had on the Middle Ages and beyond. Scholars debate whether or not this pious community described in Sefer Chassidim existed beyond the imagination of Rabbi Judah the Pious. For instance, Joseph Dan posits that Sefer Chassidim was an individual work by Rabbi Judah the Pious, not a "national work" of Ashkenazic Jewry. He concludes that the community depicted within Sefer Chassidim was merely a blueprint for a structure that was never built. Rabbi Judah's plans were never carried out. Many proofs motivated this approach. First, there is no reference in any Ashkenazic literature to any of its particular ideas. Additionally, there is no external proof of existence for Pietistic communities. A controversial movement such as this one, which castigated much of the broader community, labeling them reshaim (wicked), would certainly have been referenced by contemporary literature.

However, others such as Isaiah Tishby maintain that Sefer Chassidim is an "enormous anthology, reflecting the work of generations of Ashkenazi Hasidic leaders". This led him to formulate this phenomenon as a movement which existed for generations and had a distinct group of leaders. Ivan G. Marcus raised support for the community's historicity by pointing out references to Chassidei Ashkenaz practices in Arba'ah Turim and Sefer ha-Manhig. He further admitted that all of the points questioning its existence do raise questions, but the questions raised by Dan and Gruenwald "do not prove that the pietist world as described in SH [Sefer Hasidim] did not exist", and "the existence of the hasidim per se and the influence of their customs are attested in non-pietist rabbinic sources". Tishby also postulates that the fact that they considered all other Jews resha (iniquitous) and other anti-social tendencies (asceticism), is the reason they are not mentioned by anyone other than the Baal Tur and the Safer Haminhag, both of which only mention them but do not give them respect, rather than a reason they would be counted by their contemporaries, and the Jewish community, precisely opposing what Israeli scholar Joseph Dan holds. Prior to Dan no one questioned their existence over the centuries in which the book was studied.

Outside sources
Though there may be earlier printed mentions that still exist, the book Yuḥasin by Abraham Zacuto, of which two original texts exist from the early 16th century (1500–1503) at Jewish museums, on leaf 221 mentions 'Eleazar Ben Yehudah Ben Kalonymous of Worms', the son of Judah the Pious. It then takes a page to discuss his book Yera'i El (Fear of God) which is clearly a successor to the Pious of Ashkenaz book of this article. The book discusses many ideas including ideas of the three parts of God, etc. (not to be confused with Christianity; it makes clear, as all Judaism does, that God is not human and has no body).

Secular philosopher Martin Buber twice stated that he was influenced by the books of the Hassidei Ashkenaz, once in a letter to Jewish Nietzschean story-teller Micha Josef Berdyczewski, and a second time in his 1906 book Die Geschichten des Rabbi Nachman, which connects these ancient Jews to the 18th century Hassidism of Nachman of pre-Holocaust Breslev in Eastern Europe.

References

Sources
 Joseph Dan, “Ashkenazi Hasidim 1941-1991” in Major Trends of Jewish Mysticism 50 Years Later 1992
 T. Alexander “Rabbi Judah the Pious as a Legendary Figure” in Mysticism, Magic, Kabbala in Ashkenazi Judaism
 Gershom Scholem, Major Trends in Jewish Mysticism
 Haym Soloveitchik, “Piety, Pietism, and German Pietism” The Jewish Quarterly Review Nos. 3-4 (January–April, 2002) 455-493.
 Haym Soloveitchik, “Three themes in the ‘Sefer Hasidim,’” AJSR 1 (1976) 311-358.
 Ivan Marcus quoted in Joseph Dan, “Was there really a Hasidic movement in Medieval Germany?” in Gershom Scholem's Major Trends 50 Years After by Joseph Dan and Peter Schafer, pgs. 95-99.
 Joseph Dan, Torat Hasod Shel Chasidut Ashkenaz pg. 104-107.
 Kabbala: A Very Short Introduction by Joseph Dan.
 Haym Soloveitchik, “Three themes in the ‘Sefer Hasidim,’” AJSR 1 (1976) 311-358.
 Sefer Hasidim (SH) 1076
 SH 125 158 641 745 1035 1036, as quoted in Haym Soloveitchik, “Three themes in the ‘Sefer Hasidim,’” AJSR 1 (1976) 311-358.
 SH 122 187 191, as quoted in Haym Soloveitchik, “Three themes in the ‘Sefer Hasidim,’” AJSR 1 (1976) 311-358.
 Haym Soloveitchik, “Three themes in the ‘Sefer Hasidim,’” AJSR 1 (1976) 332.
 Joseph Dan, “Was there really a Hasidic movement in Medieval Germany?” in Gershom Scholem's Major Trends 50 Years After by Joseph Dan and Peter Schafer, pgs. 95-99
 Ivan Marcus, “The Historical Meaning of Haside Ashkenaz: Fact, Fiction or Cultural Self Image,” in Gershom Scholem's Major Trends in Jewish Mysticism: 50 Years After, edited by Joseph Dan and Peter Schäfer, 105-107

Jewish German history
Ashkenazi Jewish culture in Europe
Ashkenazi Jewish culture in Germany